Mark-Patrick Redl (born 6 January 1993) is a German footballer who plays for SV Oberachern.

External links

1993 births
Living people
German footballers
Stuttgarter Kickers players
Borussia Dortmund II players
1. FC Kaiserslautern II players
FC 08 Homburg players
SV Oberachern players
3. Liga players
Regionalliga players
Oberliga (football) players
Association football goalkeepers